Lethal Injection is the fourth studio album by American rapper Ice Cube. It was released on December 7, 1993, through Lench Mob Records and Priority Records. The production on the album was handled by QDIII, Madness 4 Real, Sir Jinx, Laylaw, D'Mag, and Ice Cube himself.

Lethal Injection was supported by three singles: "Really Doe", "You Know How We Do It", and the Funkadelic-sampling "Bop Gun (One Nation)", which became a staple on MTV. The track "Down for Whatever" also gained popularity after featuring in the 1999 film Office Space. The album received generally positive reviews from critics and was a commercial success similar to the rapper's previous albums. The album debuted at number five on the US Billboard 200, selling 215,000 copies in its first week.

Criticism
The album was heavily criticized for what many saw as Cube's pandering to gangsta rap, and for lyrics which were considered to be anti-police, racist and misogynistic, as well as the toning down of socio-political content found on his earlier efforts. The album's standing has increased over time.

Commercial performance
Lethal Injection debuted at number five on the US Billboard 200 chart, selling 215,000 copies in its first week. This became Ice Cube's third US top-ten album. The album also debuted at number one on the US Top R&B/Hip-Hop Albums chart. On February 1, 1994, the album was certified platinum by the Recording Industry Association of America (RIAA) for sales of over a million copies in the United States.

Track listing

Singles
"Really Doe"
Released: 1993
B-side: "My Skin Is My Sin"
"You Know How We Do It"
Released: February 1994
B-side: "2 'N The Morning"
"Bop Gun (One Nation)"
Released: August 1994
B-side: "Down For Whatever"

Charts

Weekly charts

Year-end charts

Certifications

See also
List of number-one albums of 1993 (U.S.)

References

1993 albums
G-funk albums
Ice Cube albums
Priority Records albums
Albums produced by Laylaw
Albums produced by Quincy Jones III
Albums recorded at Westlake Recording Studios